Ryan Robinson (born June 30, 2001) is a Canadian professional soccer player who plays as a forward.

Early life
Robinson began playing soccer at age five. He played rep soccer with Mount Hamilton Youth SC in his youth years, before joining the Toronto FC Academy in 2014.

Club career
While with the Toronto FC Academy, he played with Toronto FC III in League1 Ontario in 2018, making eight appearances.

In July 2021, Robinson signed with USL League Two side FC Manitoba, however, FC Manitoba was forced to withdraw from USL League Two due to the COVID-19 pandemic, instead playing a series of exhibition matches instead.

In October 2021, Robinson joined League1 Ontario side Vaughan Azzurri. On October 23, he scored a hat-trick against Unionville Milliken SC in a 5-1 victory.

In 2022, he went on trial with Valour FC in the Canadian Premier League, during their pre-season. Afterwards, he returned to Vaughan and during their pre-season, Robinson played in a friendly against Canadian Premier League side HFX Wanderers, and was subsequently invited to trial with the professional outfit during their preseason. After playing in all of the Wanderers' remaining pre-season matches, he signed his first professional contract with Wanderers on April 6, 2022, a one-year contract with options through 2024. He made his professional debut on April 7, coming on as a substitute against York United FC. He started his first match on May 7, against Valour FC.

International career
In December 2015, he made his debut in the Canadian national program, attending a U14 identification camp.

Career statistics

References

External links

2001 births
Living people
Association football forwards
Canadian soccer players
Soccer players from Hamilton, Ontario
Toronto FC players
FC Manitoba players
Vaughan Azzurri players
HFX Wanderers FC players
League1 Ontario players
Canadian Premier League players